Nguyễn Thị Ngọc Oanh is a former wushu taolu athlete from Vietnam. She is a three-time medalist at the World Wushu Championships including a one-time world champion, a four-time medalist at the Southeast Asian Games, and a medalist at the Asian Games and the Asian Wushu Championships. 

She is the sister of fellow wushu athlete Nguyễn Thị Mỹ Đức.

Awards 

 Labor Order, 3rd class (2004)

See also 

 List of Asian Games medalists in wushu

References 

1986 births
Living people
Vietnamese wushu practitioners
Sportspeople from Hanoi
Asian Games silver medalists for Vietnam
Asian Games medalists in wushu
Medalists at the 2002 Asian Games
Southeast Asian Games gold medalists for Vietnam
Southeast Asian Games silver medalists for Vietnam
Southeast Asian Games bronze medalists for Vietnam
Southeast Asian Games medalists in wushu
Wushu practitioners at the 2002 Asian Games